The lateral cutaneous nerve of the thigh (also called the lateral femoral cutaneous nerve) is a cutaneous nerve of the thigh. It originates from the dorsal divisions of the second and third lumbar nerves from the lumbar plexus. It passes under the inguinal ligament to reach the thigh. It supplies sensation to the skin on the lateral part of the thigh by an anterior branch and a posterior branch.

The lateral cutaneous nerve of the thigh can be investigated using ultrasound. Local anaesthetic can be injected around the nerve for skin grafts and surgery around the outer thigh. Nerve compression (usually around the inguinal ligament) can cause meralgia paraesthetica.

Structure

Origin 
The lateral cutaneous nerve of the thigh is a nerve of the lumbar plexus. It arises from the posterior rami of the second and third lumbar nerves (L2-L3).

Course and relations 
It passes through psoas major muscle, and emerges from its lateral border. It crosses the iliacus muscle obliquely, toward the anterior superior iliac spine (ASIS). It is crossed by the deep circumflex iliac artery and the deep circumflex iliac vein. It then passes under the inguinal ligament. It passes through the muscular lacuna. It then passes over the sartorius muscle into the thigh, travelling from medial to lateral. It is usually between 1 and 2 mm thick.

Branches 
The lateral cutaneous nerve of the thigh usually divides into an anterior (or anterolateral) branch and a posterior branch.

Anterior branch 
The anterior branch becomes superficial about 10 cm below the inguinal ligament. It divides into branches which are distributed to the skin of the anterior and lateral parts of the thigh, as far down as the knee. The terminal filaments of this nerve frequently communicate with the anterior cutaneous branches of the femoral nerve, and with the infrapatellar branch of the saphenous nerve, forming with them the peripatellar plexus.

Posterior branch 
The posterior branch pierces the fascia lata. It subdivides into filaments, which pass backward across the lateral and posterior surfaces of the thigh. It supplies the skin around the greater trochanter.

Variation 
The lateral cutaneous nerve of the thigh may have multiple branches. Its position with relation to the ASIS can be very variable. It may partially pass through sartorius muscle rather than over its surface. It may be absent, and the sensory supply replaced by branches of the femoral nerve and the ilioinguinal nerve.

Function 
The lateral cutaneous nerve of the thigh is a sensory nerve. It supplies the skin on the lateral (outer) part of the thigh.

Clinical significance

Ultrasound 
The lateral cutaneous nerve of the thigh can be studied using ultrasound. A patient lies on a bed facing upwards (supine). The ultrasound probe is moved along the length of the nerve, often starting from near the ASIS. The nerve is easier to see over the sartorius muscle than in other subcutaneous tissue, as there is greater contrast. It can sometimes be difficult to see due to surrounding soft tissue.

Nerve block 
The lateral cutaneous nerve of the thigh can be blocked with local anaesthetic. Ultrasound is used to guide needle insertion. This is used for procedures in the supplied area of skin, such as surgical incisions over the outer thigh, and skin grafts.

Meralgia paraesthetica 

Entrapment of the lateral cutaneous nerve of the thigh is caused by compression of the nerve near the anterior superior iliac spine and the inguinal ligament. This causes meralgia paraesthetica (Bernhardt-Roth syndrome). This may be diagnosed with ultrasound, which changes the morphology of the nerve. Changes can include general enlargement, and a hypoechoic appearance. In patients who only have meralgia paraesthetica on one side, ultrasound scans are performed on both thighs to compare the appearance of the nerve.

History 
The lateral cutaneous nerve of the thigh may also be known as the lateral femoral cutaneous nerve.

Additional images

See also 
 Cutaneous nerve
 Posterior cutaneous nerve of thigh
 Meralgia paraesthetica

References

External links 
 
  - "Posterior Abdominal Wall: Nerves of the Lumbar Plexus"
 

Nerves of the lower limb and lower torso